Putkowice Nagórne  is a village in the administrative district of Gmina Drohiczyn, within Siemiatycze County, Podlaskie Voivodeship, in north-eastern Poland.

According to the 1921 census, the village was inhabited by 131 people, among whom 126 were Roman Catholic, 2 Orthodox, and 3 Mosaic. At the same time, 123 inhabitants declared Polish nationality, 3 Jewish. There were 27 residential buildings in the village.

References

Villages in Siemiatycze County